Solo 4: Gato is a solo piano album by Franco D'Andrea. It was recorded in 2001 and released by Philology Records.

Recording and music
Material for this and seven other solo piano CDs was recorded over the period of three mornings and two afternoons in April 2001. The compositions are mainly by saxophonist Gato Barbieri. He and D'Andrea had recorded together in 1964–65.

Release and reception

Solo 3 was released by Philology Records. The AllMusic reviewer preferred the first three Solo albums, but noted that "D'Andrea's infectious playing also makes Solo 4 well worth acquiring".

Track listing
"La Vuelta / Last Tango in Paris"
"Merceditas / Ninos / It's Over"
"Jeanne"
"El Parana / Un Lago Adios / Bolivia"
"Para Mi Negra"
"Abstraction for Gato"

Personnel
Franco D'Andrea – piano

References

Franco D'Andrea albums
Solo piano jazz albums